Odd Hilt (8 March 1915 – 9 December 1986) was a Norwegian sculptor.

Biography
Hilt was born at Drammen in Buskerud, Norway. He was the son of Christian Hilt (1888–1958) and  Ragnhild Hansen (1896–1957).
He was trained at the Norwegian National Academy of Craft and Art Industry (Statens Håndverks- og Kunstindustriskole) from 1931 to 1933 and under Wilhelm Rasmussen at the Norwegian National Academy of Fine Arts (Statens kunstakademi) from 1933 to 1936.

In  1941 he was arrested in Trondheim and was imprisoned at the Falstad concentration camp outside Levanger.  In 1942 he escaped to Sweden  until the end of World War II. He  performed several works in exile including apostle figures for the altarpiece in Malmberget Church (1944).

From 1935 to 1951 he contributed to the decoration of the Nidaros Cathedral, with about forty works. Among his other sculptural works are Fortuna at Frognerkilen,  Arkebusering at Falstad, Ved vannposten at Tøyen  and several war memorials. He is represented with eight sculptures at the National Gallery of Norway.

Personal life
In 1945, he married  med Guðrun Laura Briem (1918–1996). He was the father of actress Ragnhild Hilt.

Selected works
Arkebusering (1945–46) Levanger
Appell (1947–50) Horten
Fortuna (1966–73) Frognerkilen 
Ved vannposten (1977) Tøyen

References

1915 births
1986 deaths
People from Drammen
Oslo National Academy of the Arts alumni
Norwegian resistance members
Norwegian prisoners and detainees
Norwegian Marxists
20th-century Norwegian sculptors